Rizal, officially the Municipality of Rizal is a 2nd class municipality in the province of Nueva Ecija, Philippines. According to the 2020 census, it has a population of 70,196 people.

History
Historically, two groups were known to have settled in the area. The main group consisted entirely of the pioneer-settlers who were Ilocanos, while others, who arrived later, were of different tribes with different dialects. They merged and formed a new neighborhood, originally called Bunobon after the bunobon seedlings that thrived in the soil. It became a sitio of Cabucbucan under the jurisdiction of Bongabon municipality.

In 1904, sitio Bunobon became a barrio called Nazareth. Because of the steady arrival of new settlers, a council of elders was formed. Selected as head was Apo Juliano Paraiso, one of the eldest within the group, who headed the request to the government to convert Nazareth into an independent town. Through the help of Governor Manuel Tinio and Assemblyman Isauro Gabaldon, the request of the elders was approved in 1908.

On December 26, 1912, Vice Governor Newton signed the act and simultaneously issued a proclamation creating the town of RIZAL. The town was named after Dr. José Rizal. On January 1, 1913, Don Julian Paraiso took his oath as the first Alcalde of the Municipality. In 1917 and 1918, the Bureau of Land surveyed the Municipality into homestead and residential lots. In 1930, Barangay Paco Roman became barrio thru the leadership of the late Mr. Florentino Castelo, separating it from Barangay Estrella. Sometime in 1940, General Luna became a barrio of which the area was taken from barangay Canaan and in 1954 Villa Paraiso was created into a barrio separating it from Barangay Canaan and was named in honor of late Mayor Gaudencio V. Paraiso.

During World War II, Japanese Imperial forces occupies and entering the town in Rizal in 1942. In 1945, combined U.S. and Philippine Commonwealth ground troops including the local various recognized guerrillas and Hukbalahap Communist guerrillas liberated the town and defeated Japanese Imperial forces and ended the Second World War. After the war, many families started business and agricultural and farm lands.

In 1954, Rizal lost some of its territory when the barrios of San Felipe and San Alfonso were separated to form the town of Llanera along with some territory from Talavera and San Jose.

In 1963, Villa Pascua was renamed Barangay Pag-asa which is a part of Barangay Agbanawag. In January 1968, Barangay Casilagan became a barrio thru Res. No. 2 of the Provincial Board on January 3, 1968, which was formerly a sitio of Canaan, which was bisected by the Bulalakay Creek, and it was divided into two barrios known as Canaan Este and Canaan Weste. On July 20, 1970, Sanggunian Panlalawigan passed Resolution No. 220 approving the creation of Barangay Maligaya in accordance with R.A. No. 3590, the area to be taken from the Barangay Bicos and on July 12, 1971, then the Provincial Board Resolution No. 231, Villa Labrador became a Barrio separating it to Villa Paraiso.

In July 1990, Rizal was close to the epicenter of a magnitude 7.7 earthquake. The town suffered unknown fatalities and damage to almost 1,000 homes, as well as total destruction of its city.

Geography

Barangays
Rizal is politically subdivided into 26 barangays.

 Agbannawag
 Aglipay
 Bicos
 Cabucbucan
 Calaocan District
 Canaan East
 Canaan West
 Casilagan
 Del Pilar
 Estrella
 General Luna
 Macapsing
 Maligaya
 Paco Roman
 Pag-asa
 Poblacion Central
 Poblacion East
 Poblacion Norte
 Poblacion Sur
 Poblacion West
 Portal
 San Esteban
 San Gregorio
 Santa Monica
 Villa Labrador
 Villa Paraiso

Climate

Demographics

Economy

References

External links

 [ Philippine Standard Geographic Code]
Philippine Standard Geographic Code
Philippine Census Information
Local Governance Performance Management System

Municipalities of Nueva Ecija
Populated places on the Pampanga River